An election was held on November 7, 2000, to elect all 120 members to North Carolina's House of Representatives. The election coincided with elections for other offices, including the Presidency, Governorship, U.S. House of Representatives, Council of State, and state senate. The primary election was held on May 2, 2000.

Results Summary

Incumbents defeated in primary election
George W. Miller Jr. (D-District 23), defeated by Paul Miller (D)
Stephen Wood (R-District 27), defeated by John Blust (R)
Jimmie Edward Ford (D-District 97), defeated by Larry Bell (D)

Incumbents defeated in general election
O. Max Melton (D-District 34), defeated by Fern Shubert (R)
Charlotte Gardner (R-District 35), defeated by Lorene Coates (D)
Jim Horn (D-District 48), defeated by John Weatherly (R)
John Bridgeman (D-District 76), defeated by Michael Harrington (R)
Len Sossamon (D-District 90), defeated by Linda Johnson (R)

Open seats that changed parties
Liston Ramsey (D-District 52) didn't seek re-election, seat won by Margaret Carpenter (R)

Detailed Results

Districts 1-19

District 1
Incumbent Democrat Bill Owens has represented the 1st district since 1995.

District 2
Incumbent Democrat Zeno Edwards has represented the 2nd district since 1993.

District 3
Incumbent Democrat Scott Thomas has represented the 3rd district since 1999. He ran successfully for the North Carolina Senate. Democrat Alice Graham Underhill won the open seat, defeating former Representative John M. Nichols.

District 4
Incumbent Republican Jean Preston has represented the 4th district since 1993. Incumbent Democrat Ronald Smith has represented the 4th district since 1997. Both were re-elected.

District 5
Incumbent Democrat Howard Hunter Jr. has represented the 5th district since 1989.

District 6
Incumbent Democrat Gene Rogers has represented the 6th district since 1987.

District 7
Incumbent Democrat John Hall has represented the 7th district since his appointment on February 4, 2000. Hall was re-elected to a full term.

District 8
Incumbent Democrat Edith Warren has represented the 8th district since 1999

District 9
Incumbent Democrat Marian McLawhorn has represented the 9th district since 1999.

District 10
Incumbent Democrat Russell Tucker has represented the 10th district since 1999.

District 11
Incumbent Democrat Phil Baddour has represented the 11th district since 1997 and previously from 1993 to 1995.

District 12
Incumbent Democrat Nurham Warwick has represented the 12th district since 1997.

District 13
Incumbent Republican Danny McComas has represented the 13th district since 1995.

District 14
Incumbent Democrats David Redwine, who has represented the 14th district since 1985, and Dewey Hill, who has represented the 14th district since 1992, were re-elected.

District 15
Incumbent Republican Sam Ellis has represented the 15th district since 1993.

District 16
Incumbent Democrat Douglas Yongue has represented the 16th district since 1993.

District 17
Incumbent Democrat Mary McAllister, who has represented the 17th district since 1991, was re-elected. Incumbent Democrat Theodore James Kinney, who has represented the 17th district since 1993, retired. Democrat Marvin Lucas won the open seat.

District 18
Incumbent Democrat Bill Hurley, who has represented the 18th district since 1995, was re-elected here. Incumbent Republican Mia Morris, who has represented the 18th district since 1997, was also re-elected.

District 19
Incumbent Democrat Leslie Cox, who has represented the 19th district since 1999, was re-elected. Incumbent Republican Don Davis, who has represented the 19th district since 1995, was also re-elected.

Districts 20-39

District 20
Incumbent Republican Billy Creech has represented the 20th district since 1989.

District 21
Incumbent Democrat Dan Blue has represented the 21st district since 1981.

District 22
Incumbent Democrats Jim Crawford, who has represented the 22nd district since 1995, and Gordon Allen, who has represented the 22nd district since 1997, were re-elected.

District 23
Incumbent Democrats Paul Luebke, who has represented the 23rd district since 1991, and Mickey Michaux, who has represented the 23rd district since 1985, were re-elected. Incumbent Democrat George W. Miller Jr., who has represented the 23rd district and its predecessors since 1971, lost re-nomination to fellow Democrat Paul Miller, who also was elected in the general election.

District 24
Incumbent Democrats Joe Hackney, who has represented the 24th district and its predecessors since 1981, and Verla Insko, who has represented the 24th district since 1997, were re-elected.

District 25
Incumbent Republicans Cary Allred, who has represented the 25th district since 1995, and W.B. Teague, who has represented the 25th district since 1999, were re-elected. Incumbent Democrat Nelson Cole, who has represented the 25th district since 1997, and previously from 1993 to 1995, was also re-elected.

District 26
Incumbent Democrat Alma Adams has represented the 26th district since 1994.

District 27
Incumbent Republican Stephen Wood, who has represented the 27th district and its predecessors since 1985, ran for re-election but lost the Republican nomination to John Blust. Wood ran in the general election on the Reform Party line, but again lost to Blust.

District 28
Incumbent Democrat Flossie Body-McIntyre has represented the 28th district since 1995.

District 29
Incumbent Republican Joanne Bowie has represented the 29th district since 1989.

District 30
Incumbent Republican Arlie Culp has represented the 30th district since 1989.

District 31
Incumbent Republican Richard Morgan has represented the 31st district since 1991.

District 32
Incumbent Democrat Wayne Goodwin has represented the 32nd district since 1997.

District 33
Incumbent Democrat Pryor Gibson has represented the 33rd district since 1999.

District 34
Incumbent Democrat O. Max Melton has represented the 34th district since 1999. In a rematch of the 1998 election, Republican Fern Shubert defeated Melton to win back her old seat.

District 35
Incumbent Republican Charlotte Gardner has represented the 35th district since 1985. Gardner lost re-election to Democrat Lorene Coates

District 36
Incumbent Democrat Speaker of The House Jim Black has represented the 36th district since 1991.

District 37
Incumbent Democrat Paul Reeves McCrary has represented the 37th district since 1993. McCrary didn't seek re-election and fellow Democrat Hugh Holliman won the open seat.

District 38
Incumbent Republican Harold Brubaker has represented the 38th district and its predecessors since 1977.

District 39
Incumbent Republican Lyons Gray has represented the 39th district since 1989.

Districts 40-59

District 40
Incumbent Republicans William Hiatt, Gene Wilson, and Rex Baker have all represented the 40th district since 1995.

District 41
Incumbent Republican George Holmes, who has represented the 41st district and its predecessors since 1979, was re-elected. incumbent Republican John Walter Brown, who had represented the 41st district since 1979, retired. Republican  Tracy Walker won the open seat.

District 42
Incumbent Republican Frank Mitchell has represented the 42nd district since 1993. He defeated former representative John Wayne Kahl in the general election.

District 43
Incumbent Republican Mitchell Setzer has represented the 43rd district since 1999.

District 44
Incumbent Democrat Daniel Barefoot has represented the 44th district since 1999.

District 45
Incumbent Republican Joe Kiser, who has represented the 45th district since 1995, was re-elected. Incumbent Republican Cherie Berry, who has represented the 45th district since 1993, retired to run for Labor Commissioner. Republican Mark Hilton won the open seat.

District 46
Incumbent Republican Charles Buchanan, who has represented the 46th district since 1985 (with the exception of 1993–1995), was re-elected. Incumbent Republican Gregg Thompson, who has represented the 46th district since 1993, was also re-elected.

District 47
Incumbent Democrat Walt Church has represented the 47th district since 1993.

District 48
Incumbent Republican Debbie Clary, who has represented the 48th district since 1995, was re-elected. Incumbent Democrat Andy Dedmon, who has represented the 48th district since 1997, was also re-elected. Incumbent Democrat Jim Horn, who has represented the 48th district since 1999, lost re-election to Republican John Weatherly. Weatherly had previously held the seat from 1993 to 1999.

District 49
Incumbent Republican Mitch Gillespie has represented the 49th district since 1999.

District 50
Incumbent Republican Larry Justus has represented the 50th district since 1985.

District 51
Incumbent Republicans Wilma Sherrill and Lanier Cansler, who have both represented the 51st district since 1995, were re-elected. Incumbent Democrat Martin Nesbitt, who has represented the 51st district since 1979 (with the exception of from 1995 to 1997), was also re-elected.

District 52
Incumbent Democrat Phil Haire, who has represented the 52nd district since 1999, was re-elected. Incumbent Democrat Liston Ramsey, who has represented the 52nd district and its predecessors since 1961 (with the exception of 1965–1967), retired. Republican Margaret Carpenter won the open seat.

District 53
Incumbent Republican Roger West has represented the 53rd district since his appointment on May 5, 2000. He was re-elected to a full term.

District 54
Incumbent Democrat Drew Saunders has represented the 54th district since 1997.

District 55
Incumbent Republican Ed McMahan has represented the 55th district since 1995.

District 56
Incumbent Democrat Martha Alexander has represented the 56th district since 1993.

District 57
Incumbent Republican Connie Wilson has represented the 57th distort since 1993.

District 58
Incumbent Democrat Ruth Easterling has represented the 58th district and its predecessors since 1977.

District 59
Incumbent Democrat Pete Cunningham has represented the 59th district since 1987.

Districts 60-79

District 60
Incumbent Democrat Beverly Earle has represented the 60th district since 1995.

District 61
Incumbent Republican Art Pope has represented the 61st district since his appointment on April 13, 1999.

District 62
Incumbent Republican David Miner has represented the 62nd district since 1993.

District 63
Incumbent Democrat Jennifer Weiss has represented the 63rd district since her appointment on November 29, 1999. Weiss was re-elected to a full term.

District 64
incumbent Democrat Bob Hensley has represented the 64th district since 1991.

District 65
Incumbent Republican Rick Eddins has represented the 65th district since 1995.

District 66
Incumbent Democrat Larry Womble has represented the 66th district since 1995.

District 67
Incumbent Democrat Warren Oldham has represented the 67th district since 1991.

District 68
Incumbent Republican Trudi Walend has represented the 68th district since 1999.

District 69
Incumbent Republican Jim Gulley has represented the 69th district since 1997.

District 70
Incumbent Democrat Toby Fitch has represented the 70th district since 1985.

District 71
Incumbent Democrat Joe Tolson has represented the 71st district since 1997.

District 72
Incumbent Republican Gene Arnold has represented the 72nd district since 1993.

District 73
Incumbent Republican Wayne Sexton has represented the 73rd district since 1993.

District 74
Incumbent Republican Julia Craven Howard has represented the 74th district and its predecessors since 1989.

District 75
Incumbent Democrat Alex Warner has represented the 75th district since 1987.

District 76
Incumbent Democrat John Bridgeman has represented the 76th district since 1999. He lost re-election to Republican Michael Harrington.

District 77
Incumbent Republican Carolyn Russell has represented the 77th district since 1991.

District 78
Incumbent Democrat Stanley Fox has represented the 78th district since 1995.

District 79
Incumbent Democrat William Wainwright has represented the 79th district and its predecessors since 1991.

Districts 80-98

District 80
Incumbent Republican Robert Grady has represented the 80th district and its predecessors since 1987.

District 81
Incumbent Republican Tim Tallent has represented the 81st district and its predecessors since 1985. Tallent retired and fellow Republican Jeff Barnhart won the open seat.

District 82
Incumbent Republican Bobby Barbee has represented the 82nd district and its predecessors since 1987.

District 83
Incumbent Republican Eugene McCombs has represented the 83rd district since 1993.

District 84
Incumbent Republican Michael Decker has represented the 84th district since 1985.

District 85
Incumbent Democrat Ronnie Sutton has represented the 85th district since 1993.

District 86
Incumbent Democrat Bill Culpepper has represented the 86th district since 1993.

District 87
Incumbent Democrat  Donald Bonner has represented the 87th district since 1997.

District 88
Incumbent Republican Theresa Esposito has represented the 88th district and its predecessors since 1985.

District 89
Incumbent Democrats Mary Jarrell and Maggie Jeffus have both represented the 80th district and its predecessors since 1991, with the exception of 1995–1997. Both were re-elected.

District 90
Incumbent Democrat Len Sossamon has represented the 90th district since his appointment on May 17, 2000. Sossamon ran for re-election to a full term but was defeated by Republican Linda Johnson.

District 91
Incumbent Republican Edgar Starnes has represented the 91st district since 1997.

District 92
Incumbent Republican Russell Capps has represented the 92nd district since 1993.

District 93
Incumbent Republican John Rayfield has represented the 93rd district since 1995.

District 94
Incumbent Republican Jerry Dockham has represented the 94th district and its predecessors since 1991.

District 95
Incumbent Republican Minority leader Leo Daughtry has represented the 95th district since 1993.

District 96
Incumbent Democrat Edd Nye has represented the 96th district and its predecessors since 1985.

District 97
Incumbent Democrat Jimmie Edward Ford has represented the 97th district since his appointment on March 21, 2000. Ford ran for re-election but lost re-nomination to Larry Bell. Bell won the general election.

District 98
Incumbent Democrat Thomas Wright has represented the 98th district since 1993.

Notes

References

North Carolina House of Representatives
House of Representatives
2000